Sabria-Faiza Dahane (born 7 February 1985) is an Algerian former swimmer, who specialized in individual medley events. She is a member of the Lyon Swimming Club in Lyon, France.

Dahane qualified for the women's 400 m individual medley at the 2004 Summer Olympics in Athens, by attaining both an Algerian record and a B-standard entry time of 5:00.74. She finished in last place on the first heat by more than nine seconds behind Bulgaria's Ana Dangalakova, recording a slowest time of 5:10.20. Dahane failed to advance into the final, as she placed twenty-fourth overall in the morning's preliminary heats.

References

1985 births
Living people
Sportspeople from Algiers
Algerian female swimmers
Olympic swimmers of Algeria
Swimmers at the 2004 Summer Olympics
Female medley swimmers
21st-century Algerian women
20th-century Algerian women